Saqultah is a small Upper Egyptian city near Akhmim. 
It is located on the east bank of the Nile, in the Sohag Governorate.

Etymology
Saqultah is one of the oldest villages in Egypt, originally named Saqiyat Qultah, or Saqiyas of Kollouthos.

The city has been named in:

 the Laws of Court (قوانين الدواوين) by the 6th century Egyptian writer Al-Asaad bin Mamati
 the Tuhfat al-Irshad as El Quseyya
 the Mu’jam al-Buldan (glossary of countries): "Qulta is a good village, known as Saqiya Qalta in Upper Egypt, east of the Nile, near Akhmim."
 the works of Al-Suyuti, quoting the Akhmimiya, though he distorts the name by integrating it with Al-Sadr, so it became "Saqlath", as mentioned in old calendar books from 1231 AH.
 the 1877 tables of the Ministry of Finance mention it as “Saqlath and the Arabs”.

See also

 List of cities and towns in Egypt

References 

Populated places in Sohag Governorate